Adil-Sultan (died 1363) was Khan of the Chagatai Khanate in 1363. He was the son of Muhammad I ibn Pulad.

1363 deaths
Mongol Empire Muslims
Chagatai khans
14th-century monarchs in Asia
Year of birth unknown